Sankaku (Japanese:  triangle) may refer to:

  (film)
 "「△」Sankaku", an album and a single by Bloodthirsty Butchers

See also
Sangaku
Senkaku Islands